The Barbara Ann Karmanos Cancer Institute, headquartered in Detroit, is the largest cancer research and provider network in Michigan and has 16 treatment locations. It is one of 51 National Cancer Institute-designated comprehensive cancer treatment and research centers in the United States. Affiliated with the Wayne State University School of Medicine, the institute has 1,000 staff members, including 300 doctors, and 100 researchers. The staff treats approximately 12,000 patients each year  and operates with a budget of $260 million.

Karmanos' vision is a world free of cancer and its mission is to lead in transformative cancer care, research and education through courage, commitment and compassion.

Karmanos has one of the largest clinical trials programs in the nation, giving patients access to more than 250 treatments often available only at Karmanos. It conducts 800 cancer-specific scientific investigations programs and clinical trials each year. The institute has a Phase 1 program, a participating site in the Early Therapeutics Clinical Trials Network (ET-CTN) of the NCI. Gerold Bepler is chief executive officer and president of KCI and Justin Klamerus is president of Barbara Ann Karmanos Cancer Hospital & Network, overseeing clinical operations in Detroit, as well as the Karmanos cancer network across Michigan.

History
Karmanos began as the Detroit Institute for Cancer Research in 1943 and was later named the Michigan Cancer Foundation, encompassing the Meyer L. Prentis Comprehensive Cancer Center of Metropolitan Detroit and the cancer programs of the Detroit Medical Center and Wayne State University. In 1995, the cancer center was named after Barbara Ann Karmanos, the late wife of Peter Karmanos Jr., former chairman and chief executive officer of Compuware Corporation. Barbara Ann Karmanos succumbed to breast cancer at the age of 46.

On October 30, 2013, Karmanos Cancer Institute and McLaren Health Care signed an agreement that created the largest cancer research and provider network in Michigan. The agreement was finalized in January 2014.

Recognition
Karmanos has been named one of America's Best Hospitals for Cancer Care & Research by the Women's Choice Award for 2018. Previously, Karmanos had been ranked as one of America's Best Hospitals for Cancer Care by the Women's Choice Award, from 2011-2012, as well as 2014-2017. It also won the Women's Choice Award for Patient Experience in 2017.

Leadership
The Institute is under the direction of CEO and President Gerold Bepler.

References

Cancer organizations based in the United States
Non-profit organizations based in Michigan
NCI-designated cancer centers
Medical and health organizations based in Michigan